The Belfry Club founded as the Germantown Academy Dramatics Society was founded in 1894 by Germantown Academy student, J. Warner Johnson, a member of the class of 1895. The club is the oldest (or one of the oldest) high school dramatic societies in the United States of America and has produced at least one show per school year since its founding in 1894.

Early years
In 1894, J. Warner Johnson, a student at Germantown Academy then located in Germantown, Philadelphia, Pennsylvania, and a few of his schoolmates formed a dramatic society with the intention to appreciate the performing arts before their college years. Drama clubs like the University of Pennsylvania's Mask and Wig were established already and popular among college students of the late 19th century. The group, led by Johnson brought the idea to Germantown Academy alumnus Frank Palmer, an 1885 GA alumnus who then led the society for another fifteen years. The first production was of the comedy/drama Married Life held at the Workingmen's Club Hall on nearby Chelten Avenue in Germantown, Philadelphia, Pennsylvania. Admission was $1 and 50 cents for seats in the upper gallery. The play was given to raise money for the GA Athletic Association and sold out. After the success of the first year, the students continued the tradition that lasts today.

In 1895, the name of the society was changed to The Belfry Club in honor of the notable Germantown Academy symbol of the Belfry that sits atop the schoolhouse. After a few years, the play grew into a focal point of the school year as it was given the night before the Germantown Academy, Penn Charter football game and was then followed by a dance with surrounding girls' schools.

Twentieth century

List of Belfry Productions
1894- Married Life
1895- The Wolves and the Lamb
1896- Engaged
1897- Mrs. Asmodeus
1898- The Shakespeare Water Cure
1899- The Rivals
1900- Dandy Dick
1901- All the Comforts of Home
1902- Seven-Twenty-Eight
1903- The Pickwickians
1904- A Night Off
1905- The Passing Regiment
1906- The Prince and the Pauper
1907- Love in Harness
1908- The Senator
1909- The Amazons
1910- The Texas Steer Street
1911- What Happened to Jones
1989- The Skin Of Our Teeth
1990- Brigadoon
1999- Great Shakes!, Carousel
2000- Working
2001- All I Really Need to Know I Learned in Kindergarten, Anything Goes
2002- Once in a Lifetime, Crazy for You
2003- Museum, Once on this Island
2004- The Crucible, Grease, Twilight Zone
2005- Box Office of the Damned, A Midsummer Nights' Dream
2006- Idolatry, Les Misérables
2008- Noises Off
2009- An Ideal Husband, A Little Night Music
2010- Sweet Charity
2012- Urinetown: The Musical, Rumors
2013- 9 to 5, King Lear
2014- Bat Boy: the Musical, The Complete Works of William Shakespeare
2015- Little Shop of Horrors
2017- The Burnt Part Boys, Shakespeare's Julius Caesar
2018- A Man For All Seasons, Spring Awakening
2019- Chess, Rumors
2020- Chicago
2021- The Internet is Distract--OH LOOK A KITTEN!, Into The Woods
2023- Urinetown, The Winter's Tale

Theatrical organizations in the United States